Morse code is a method used in telecommunication to encode text characters.

Morse Code may also refer to:
 American Morse code, an early form of the code
 Morse Code (album), a mixtape by Sage the Gemini
 Morse Code (horse), a racehorse